Domkowo  is a village in the administrative district of Gmina Grunwald, within Ostróda County, Warmian-Masurian Voivodeship, in northern Poland.

The village has a population of 370.

References

Domkowo